Tennis at the 2018 Summer Youth Olympics was held on 7–14 October. The events took place at the Buenos Aires Lawn Tennis Club in Buenos Aires, Argentina.

Qualification 
Each National Olympic Committee (NOC) can enter a maximum of 4 competitors, 2 per each gender. As hosts, Argentina is given 2 quotas, 1 per each gender should they not qualify normally and a further 6 competitors, 3 per each gender will be decided by the Tripartite Commission. 

The remaining 56 places shall be decided by the ITF World Junior Rankings, ATP rankings, WTA rankings update on 16 July 2018. The first 12 spots per each gender will go to the top ranked athletes in the ITF World Junior Rankings. The next 10 spots per gender will go to any eligible athlete ranked in the top 450 in the ATP rankings for boys and the top 200 in the WTA rankings for girls. Should any spots remain they will be reallocated to the top ranked athletes in the ITF World Junior Rankings. The remaining 6 spots per gender will go to the best ranked athlete from the ITF World Junior Rankings from any of the six regional associations not yet represented. Should any spots remain they will be reallocated to the next best ranked athlete in the ITF World Rankings, regardless of region.

To be eligible to participate at the Youth Olympics athletes must have been born between 1 January 2000 and 31 December 2003. Furthermore, all qualified players will take place in the doubles and mixed doubles events.

Boys

Girls

Medal summary

Medal table

 Note: Medals for mixed teams have not been counted towards their individual nation.

Events

References

External links
Official Results Book – Tennis

 
2018 Summer Youth Olympics events
Youth Summer Olympics
2018
Tennis tournaments in Argentina
2018 in Argentine tennis